Arisaema erubescens is a flowering plant species in the genus Arisaema, endemic to Nepal.

Description
The limb of its throat is deep green in colour but can sometimes be with purple coloured outside margin and pale green inside.

Uses
Arisaema  erubescens contains the phenolic compound paeonol.

References

External links

erubescens
Plants described in 1831
Flora of Nepal